The American Statistician is a quarterly peer-reviewed scientific journal covering statistics published by Taylor & Francis on behalf of the American Statistical Association. It was established in 1947. The editor-in-chief is Daniel R. Jeske, a professor at the University of California, Riverside.

External links 
 

Taylor & Francis academic journals
Statistics journals
Publications established in 1947
English-language journals
Quarterly journals
1947 establishments in the United States
Academic journals associated with learned and professional societies of the United States